Escadron de détection et de contrôle aéroportés 36 Berry is a French Air and Space Force (Armée de l'air et de l'espace) Airborne Detection and Control Squadron located at BA 702 Avord Air Base, Cher, France which operates the Boeing E-3F Sentry.

During March 2017 the unit took part in Exercise Real Thaw 2017 in Portugal.

See also

 List of French Air and Space Force aircraft squadrons

References

French Air and Space Force squadrons